Matubhuiyan is a union parishad under Daganbhuiyan Upazila, Feni District, Chittagong Division, Bangladesh. It was established in 1959.

The Chotta Feni River flows south through the union. Matubhuiyan Union is divided into 10 mauzas: Ashrafpur, Dakshin Dharmmapur, Dakshin Lalpur, Krishna Rampur, Maheshpur, Mamarizpur, Paschim Hirapur, Ramanandapur, Salamnagar (Lakhanpur), and Uttar Alipur.

Notable residents
 Abdus Salam, a martyr of the Bengali Language Movement, was born in Lakhanpur village in 1925.
 Master Abdul Ali, Former assistant head master, Karim Ullah High School

References

Populated places in Feni District
Unions of Daganbhuiyan Upazila